The Team Speedway Polish Championship (Polish: Drużynowe Mistrzostwa Polski, DMP) is an annual speedway event held each year in different Polish clubs organized by the Polish Motor Union (PZM) since 1948. In 2000, the First Division was renamed Ekstraliga, and the number of teams was reduced.

The team winning the league is awarded a gold medal and declared Polish Team Champions. Teams finishing second and third are awarded silver and bronze medals respectively.

Previous winners

See also
 Polish Speedway First League (1. Liga)
 Polish Speedway Second League (2. Liga)

References

 
Team